The Great Recoinage may refer to either of the following events in the history of British coinage.

The Great Recoinage of 1696, which was conducted to address problems with the silver coins then in currency, such as clipping and arbitrage.
The Great Recoinage of 1816, which reintroduced silver coinage for values up to £2 and replaced the Guinea with the Sovereign.